Bowershall is a village in Fife, Scotland, UK, situated near Craigluscar Hill, two miles north of Dunfermline, one mile north of Townhill, and to the west of Loch Fitty, south of the B915.

References

External links

 Gazetteer for Scotland entry on Bowershall

Villages in Fife